Bhagavatar may refer to:

 M. K. Thyagaraja Bhagavathar (1910–1959), known as MKT, Tamil Actor
 Honnappa Bhagavathar (1915–1992), Kannada Cinema Pioneer and Tamil, Kannada Artist
 Palghat Srirama Bhagavathar (1889–1957), Carnatic vocalist
 Muthiah Bhagavatar (1877–1945), composer
 Chembai Vaidyanatha Bhagavatar (1896–1974), Carnatic singer